Ronald Allen (1930–1991) was an English character actor.

Ronald, Ronnie, or Ron Allen may also refer to:

Ron Allen (skateboarder) (born 1964) is a goofy-footed American skateboarder from Visalia, California
Ronnie Allen (1929–2001), English football player and manager
Ronnie Allen (pool player) (1938–2013), American pool player
Ronald W. Allen (born c. 1942), American businessman
Ronald J. Allen,  John Henry Wigmore Professor of Law at Northwestern University
Ron Allen (baseball) (born 1943), Major League Baseball first baseman
Ron Allen (footballer) (1935–2006), English football fullback for Lincoln City
Ron Allen (playwright) (1947–2010), American poet and playwright
Ronald Wilberforce Allen (1889–1936), English lawyer and Liberal politician
Ronald Allen was a pseudonym of Alan Ayckbourn

See also
Ron Allan (1924–1997), Australian rules footballer
Allen (surname)